Habas may refer to:

 Habas, Landes, a commune in France in the Landes department
 Habas, Yemen, a village in Yemen in the Ṣan‘ā’ governorate
 Peeled fava beans